Näläntöjärvi is a lake in Kiuruvesi, Finland.

See also
List of lakes in Finland

References
 Finnish Environment Institute: Lakes in Finland
 Etelä-Savon ympäristökeskus: Saimaa, nimet ja rajaukset 

Lakes of Kiuruvesi